John Kresse Arena is a 3,000-seat multi-purpose arena in Charleston, South Carolina. It was the home to the College of Charleston Cougars basketball team from 1982 to 2008. The facility opened as the F. Mitchell Johnson Arena in 1982.  In 1994, it was renamed after the school's longtime head basketball coach John Kresse--making Kresse one of the few active collegiate coaches to coach in an arena that is named for him.  It hosted the 1997 and 1998 Atlantic Sun Conference men's basketball tournaments. It was replaced by Carolina First Arena, now TD Arena, which opened in October 2008.

External links
CofCSports.com

College of Charleston Cougars basketball
Sports venues in Charleston, South Carolina
Indoor arenas in South Carolina
Basketball venues in South Carolina
Defunct college basketball venues in the United States